Karin Molander (born Katarina Margareta Elisabet Edwertz, 20 May 1889 – 3 September 1978) was a Swedish stage and film actress whose career spanned over five decades.

Career
Born Katarina Margareta Elisabet Edwertz in Stockholm, Sweden, she began taking classes from theater actress Julia Håkansson at a young age. She debuted on stage at the Vasa Theatre in 1907 and was engaged at the Intiman Theatre from 1911 to 1920, the Lorensberg Theatre from 1920 to 1922 and at the Royal Dramatic Theatre in two phases: 1922 to 1925 and again from 1931 to 1936. Molander made her film debut in 1913 in director Victor Sjöström's Halvblod. Working with filmmaker Mauritz Stiller, Molander became a very popular leading lady in silent films, a symbol of the young, modern and emancipated women of the 1910s. She is possibly best recalled in director Mauritz Stiller's 1920 social satire Erotikon, one of many films by Stiller she appeared in.

Personal life
Molander was married twice. Her first marriage was to Swedish film director Gustaf Molander from 1909 to 1919, which produced a son - actor and producer Harald Molander - but ended in divorce. She married actor Lars Hanson in 1920 and the couple remained married until Hanson's death in 1965.

Molander died in Täby, at Höstsol, which was a foundation for retired actors which had been founded by the Teaterförbundet (Swedish Union for Performing Arts and Film) in 1978, aged 89. She was buried at the Norra Begravningsplatsen cemetery in Solna.

Selected filmography
Half Breed (Swedish title: Halvblod) (1914)
Hearts That Meet (Swedish title: Hjärtan som mötas) (1914)
The Lass from the Stormy Croft (Swedish title:  Tösen från Stormyrtorpet) (1917)
Synnöve Solbakken (1919)
Erotikon (1920)
Johan (1921)
Gabrielle (1954)

References

External links
 
photograph of Karin Molander
 

1889 births
1978 deaths
Swedish stage actresses
Swedish film actresses
Swedish silent film actresses
20th-century Swedish actresses
Actresses from Stockholm